Houma is a village on the island of ʻEua in Tonga. It is one of the original villages of ʻEua, and is located in the north of the island. The population is 310.

References

Populated places in ʻEua